Upper Lawn is an unincorporated community in South Londonderry Township in Lebanon County, Pennsylvania, United States. Upper Lawn is located at the intersection of Pennsylvania Route 341, Lawn Road, and Gingrich Road.

References

Unincorporated communities in Lebanon County, Pennsylvania
Unincorporated communities in Pennsylvania